is a tactical role-playing game developed by Sega for the Sega Mega Drive in 1991. It was only released in Japan.

The game offers a unique soundtrack for each of the many playable "races" in the game, and has various levels of gameplay that ranged from arcade Archon-style creature-on-creature combat to strategy similar to Koei's strategy games like Gemfire and Nobunaga's Ambition. Two-player games are also an option, given the variety that the game offered with the occasional arcade action battle to break up the quiet strategy and planning.

References

External links

1991 video games
Fantasy video games
Japan-exclusive video games
Sega Genesis games
Tactical role-playing video games
Video games developed in Japan
Virtual Console games
Multiplayer and single-player video games